The Kalinin K-7 was a heavy experimental aircraft designed and tested in the Soviet Union in the early 1930s. It was of unusual configuration, with twin booms and large underwing pods housing fixed landing gear and machine gun turrets. In the passenger version, seats were arranged inside the 2.3-meter thick (7 ft 7 in) wings. The airframe was welded from KhMA chrome-molybdenum steel. The original design called for six engines in the wing leading edge, but when the projected loaded weight was exceeded, two more engines were added to the trailing edges of the wing, one right and one left of the central passenger pod. Nemecek states in his book that at first only one further pusher engine was added.

Design 
The K-7 was designed by World War I aviator and Soviet aircraft designer Konstantin Kalinin at the aviation design bureau he headed in Kharkiv, Ukraine, It was one of the biggest aircraft built before the jet age. It had an unusual arrangement of six tractor engines on the wing leading edge and a single engine in pusher configuration at the rear.

As a troop transport it had capacity for 112 fully equipped paratroopers.

Development
The K-7 was built in two years in Kharkiv, starting in 1931.

The K-7 first flew on 11 August 1933. The very brief first flight showed instability and serious vibration caused by the airframe resonating at the engine frequency. The solution to this was thought to be to shorten and strengthen the tail booms, little being known then about the natural frequencies of structures and their response to vibration. The aircraft completed seven test flights before a crash due to structural failure of one of the tail booms on 21 November 1933.

The existence of the aircraft had only recently been announced by Pravda, which declared it was "victory of the utmost political importance," since it had been built with Soviet, rather than imported, steel.

The accident killed 14 people aboard and one on the ground. Flight speculated that sabotage was suspected as the investigating committee had representation by the state security organization, the Joint State Political Directorate (OGPU).

However, there appeared recently some speculation in the Russian aviation press about the role of politics and the competing design office of Andrei Tupolev, suggesting possible sabotage. Although two more prototypes were ordered in 1933, the project was cancelled in 1935 before they could be completed.

Specifications (K-7)

See also
Tupolev ANT-20

References

External links

 Airplane-Giant K-7  — translation of an article from Russian Modelist-Constructor magazine, December 1989
 

1930s Soviet bomber aircraft
K-7
Twin-boom aircraft
Abandoned military aircraft projects of the Soviet Union
Push-pull aircraft